Pardee may refer to:

People
Pardee (surname)
Pardee Butler, American clergyman and abolitionist

Places

United States
Pardee, Kansas
Pardee, Virginia
Pardee, West Virginia
Pardee Home
Pardee Homes
Frederick S. Pardee RAND Graduate School
Pardee Reservoir and dam named in honor of George Pardee